Plymouth Comprehensive High School (commonly referred to as Plymouth High School) is a public comprehensive high school located in Plymouth, Wisconsin. It serves grades 9-12 and is part of the Plymouth Joint School District. The school is part of the East Central Conference for WIAA athletics.

With an enrollment of approximately 800 students and 53 full-time teachers, Plymouth High School has a 94 percent graduation rate. More than two-thirds of Plymouth graduates pursue higher education. Plymouth High School also offers college credit courses.

Enrollment 
From 2000–2019, high school enrollment declined 20.6%.

Enrollment at Plymouth High School, 2000–2019

Notable alumni
Tony Evers, American politician and educator, 46th Governor of Wisconsin
Beau Hoopman, Olympic rower who won gold in Athens 2004 and bronze in Beijing 2008 in the men's eights.
Edwin J. Larson, Wisconsin businessman and politician
Tyler Vorpagel (class of 2003), Wisconsin state legislator

References

External links
Plymouth High School

Public high schools in Wisconsin
Schools in Sheboygan County, Wisconsin